is a 1978 Japanese anime superhero science fiction film and a version of the anime series of the same name.

Plot 
Sosai X traveled millions of light years to reach the planet Earth and creates a mutant Berg Katse. Thirty years later he is the leader of the terrorist organization known as Galactor. They want to conquer the world. Since Galactor controls the mechanical monster "Turtle King," the nations of the world live in fear.

Earth's only hope lies with five teenagers who can move like shadows. They are Gatchaman, five superheroes who arrive in their spaceship "God Phoenix" to stop Galactor's Machiavellian plans of world domination.

Cast

Production
The movie is a feature-length retelling of the events of the TV series consisting primarily of footage from key episodes, namely the first two episodes, 51-53 (the V2 project arc) and the final four episodes. However, the first three minutes of the movie consists of newly animated footage depicting the arrival of Leader X on Earth and the birth of Berg Katse.

Instead of the music from the TV show by Bob Sakuma, an all-new score was composed by Koichi Sugiyama and performed by the NHK Symphony Orchestra. It was notably the first Japanese animated movie to feature a stereo soundtrack.

Other credits
 Kihachi Okamoto - Executive Producer

References

Further reading 
 G-Force: Animated

External links 
 
 

1978 anime films
1970s action films
1970s science fiction films
Animated films based on animated series
Movie
Ninja in anime and manga
Japanese science fiction action films
Sentai Filmworks
1970s Japanese films
1970s superhero films
Japanese animated superhero films
Japanese animated science fiction films
1970s animated superhero films